The operational transconductance amplifier (OTA) is an amplifier whose differential input voltage produces an output current. Thus, it is a voltage controlled current source (VCCS). There is usually an additional input for a current to control the amplifier's transconductance. The OTA is similar to a standard operational amplifier in that it has a high impedance differential input stage and that it may be used with negative feedback.

The first commercially available integrated circuit units were produced by RCA in 1969 (before being acquired by General Electric) in the form of the CA3080. Although most units are constructed with bipolar transistors, field effect transistor units are also produced. The OTA is not as useful by itself in the vast majority of standard op-amp functions as the ordinary op-amp because its output is a current. One of its principal uses is in implementing electronically controlled applications such as variable frequency oscillators and filters and variable gain amplifier stages which are more difficult to implement with standard op-amps.

Principal differences from standard operational amplifiers 

 Its output of a current contrasts to that of standard operational amplifier whose output is a voltage.
 It is usually used "open-loop"; without negative feedback in linear applications. This is possible because the magnitude of the resistance attached to its output controls its output voltage. Therefore, a resistance can be chosen that keeps the output from going into saturation, even with high differential input voltages.

Basic operation 

In the ideal OTA, the output current is a linear function of the differential input voltage, calculated as follows:

where Vin+ is the voltage at the non-inverting input, Vin− is the voltage at the inverting input and gm is the transconductance of the amplifier.

The amplifier's output voltage is the product of its output current and its load resistance:

The voltage gain is then the output voltage divided by the differential input voltage:

The transconductance of the amplifier is usually controlled by an input current, denoted Iabc ("amplifier bias current"). The amplifier's transconductance is directly proportional to this current. This is the feature that makes it useful for electronic control of amplifier gain, etc.

Non-ideal characteristics 

As with the standard op-amp, practical OTA's have some non-ideal characteristics. These include:

 Input stage non-linearity at higher differential input voltages due to the characteristics of the input stage transistors. In the early devices, such as the CA3080, the input stage consisted of two bipolar transistors connected in the differential amplifier configuration. The transfer characteristics of this connection are approximately linear for differential input voltages of 20 mV or less. This is an important limitation when the OTA is being used open loop as there is no negative feedback to linearize the output. One scheme to improve this parameter is mentioned below.
 Temperature sensitivity of transconductance.
 Variation of input and output impedance, input bias current and input offset voltage with the transconductance control current Iabc.

Subsequent improvements

Earlier versions of the OTA had neither the Ibias terminal (shown in the diagram) nor the diodes (shown adjacent to it). They were all added in later versions. As depicted in the diagram, the anodes of the diodes are attached together and the cathode of one is attached to the non inverting input (Vin+) and the cathode of the other to the inverting input (Vin−). The diodes are biased at the anodes by a current (Ibias) that is injected into the Ibias terminal. These additions make two substantial improvements to the OTA. First, when used with input resistors, the diodes distort the differential input voltage to offset a significant amount of input stage non linearity at higher differential input voltages. According to National Semiconductor, the addition of these diodes increases the linearity of the input stage by a factor of 4. That is, using the diodes, the signal distortion level at 80 mV of differential input is the same as that of the simple differential amplifier at a differential input of 20 mV. Second, the action of the biased diodes offsets much of the temperature sensitivity of the OTA's transconductance.

A second improvement is the integration of an optional-use output buffer amplifier to the chip on which the OTA resides. This is actually a convenience to a circuit designer rather than an improvement to the OTA itself; dispensing with the need to employ a separate buffer. It also allows the OTA to be used as a traditional op-amp, if desired, by converting its output current to a voltage.

An example of a chip combining both of these features is the National Semiconductor LM13600 and its successor, the LM13700.

See also 
 Current differencing transconductance amplifier
 Transimpedance amplifier

Notes

External links 
 A Short Discussion of the Operational Transconductance Amplifier (OTA)
 Comparison of Operational Transconductance Amplifiers (archive)
 Examples: CA3080 (obsolete product), MAX 435 (obsolete product), MAX 436 (obsolete product), LM13700, OPA860, OPA861
 Discrete OTAs for Synth-DIY & Elektor-Formant-Upgrades (archive)

Electronic amplifiers
Linear integrated circuits